The Raid of the Ghetto of Rome took place on 16 October 1943. A total of 1,259 people, mainly members of the Jewish community—numbering 363 men, 689 women, and 207 children—were detained by the Gestapo. Of these detainees, 1,023 were identified as Jews and deported to the Auschwitz concentration camp. Of these deportees, only fifteen men and one woman survived.

Ghetto

The Ghetto of Rome had been established in 1555. By the time of the raid, it was almost 400 years old and consisted of four cramped blocks around the Portico d’Ottavia, wedged between the Theatre of Marcellus, the Fontana delle Tartarughe, Palazzo Cenci, and the river Tiber.

Prelude

When Nazi Germany occupied Rome two days after the Italian surrender on 8 September 1943, 8,000 Italian Jews were in Rome, one-fifth of all Jews in Italy. Many of those had moved south after the Allied landing, hoping to find safety from Nazi persecution.

The German military commander of Rome, General Reiner Stahel, was initially wary that any action against the Jews of Rome would draw condemnation from Pope Pius XII, of which he had been warned by Bishop Alois Hudal, rector of the German church in Rome. This condemnation, however, never materialised, which has led to considerable controversy. Stahel decided against ordering deportation without official authority from the German foreign ministry. Germany's Consul-General Eitel Friedrich Möllhausen went so far as to write to Foreign Minister Joachim von Ribbentrop in order to suggest that the Roman Jews be interned in Italian camps rather than deported, but Ribbentrop never dared to act against the Sicherheitsdienst (SD), from which Stahel received his orders. The role of the German ambassador to the Vatican, Ernst von Weizsäcker, in these events remains a matter of controversy.

The community delivered this sum on the deadline of midday, 28 September, with the assistance of the non-Jewish citizens of Rome. This left the Jewish community with the impression that the Germans were only after loot, especially the priceless treasures of the Biblioteca della Comunità Israelitica community library.

Raid
On the morning of 16 October 1943, 365 German security and police forces (the Italian police were considered too unreliable) sealed off the Ghetto, which held a large part of the Jewish community at the time, turning it into a virtual prison. Theodor Dannecker, recently appointed chief of the Judenreferat in Italy and tasked with implementing the Final Solution, the genocide of the Jews, in Italy, had ordered the Ghetto to be cleared. Some Jews in the Ghetto managed to escape over rooftops.

In the raid, 1,259 people were detained, comprising 363 men, 689 women, and 207 children. Afterwards, non-Jewish prisoners were released while 1,023 Jews were taken to the Collegio militare in the Palazzo Salviati in Trastevere. Two days later, at least 1,035 prisoners were loaded onto Holocaust trains at Tiburtina station and deported to Auschwitz. Only 16 survived.

Aftermath
At the time of the raid, The Italian racial laws (Italian: Leggi Razziali), were already promulgated by the Council of Ministers in Fascist Italy as from 1938 in order to enforce racial discrimination and segregation in the Kingdom of Italy. It restricted the civil rights of Italian Jews, banned books written by Jewish authors, and excluded Jews from public offices, education, most professions and marriage with Italians. Additional laws stripped Jews of their assets, restricted travel, and finally, provided for their confinement in internal exile. The deportation of Jews in Italy began on September 8, 1943, after German troops seized control of Northern and Central Italy freed Benito Mussolini from prison and installed him as the head of the puppet state of the Italian Social Republic.

During the of the German occupation, the Jews of Rome continued to live in hiding, under constant threat of arrest and deportation, until the liberation of the city by the Allies on 4 June 1944. In total, a quarter of the Jewish population of Rome—over 2,000 people—was deported, of which only 102 survived the Holocaust. Additionally, another 75 Roman Jews were murdered in the Ardeatine massacre, when 335 civilians were executed as a reprisal for a bombing attack on SS soldiers.

The Italian police in Rome, unlike in many other parts of German-occupied Italy, did not participate in the arrests of Jews, and the general public objected and resisted such arrests. For these reasons, a sizeable proportion of the Jews in Rome avoided arrest and survived the Holocaust, often hiding in the Vatican or other Catholic institutions.

Of the main perpetrators, Theodor Dannecker committed suicide following his capture in December 1945. Herbert Kappler was sentenced by a military court in 1948 to life imprisonment for his role in the Ardeatine massacre, escaped prison in 1977, and died less than a year later.

Pope Pius XII's role in the events has been the subject of considerable controversy, due to the proximity of the Vatican and the Roman Ghetto. According to Michael Phayer, "the question of the pope's silence has become the focus of intense historical debate and analysis" because the deportations occurred "under his very windows". The term "under his very windows" was used as the title of a book on the subject by American historian Susan Zuccotti. The phrase is based on an actual quotation from the report of Ernst von Weizsäcker, the German ambassador to the Vatican, who reported to Berlin that the razzia had taken place "under the Pope's windows". British historian Ian Kershaw wrote that "A strong and unequivocal protest from the Pontiff might well have deterred the German occupiers, unsure of the reactions, and prevented the deportations of the Jews they could lay their hands upon. The Germans were expecting such a protest. It never came."

Commemoration
A number of stone plaques have been unveiled in the Roman Ghetto and at Tiburtina railway station to commemorate the arrest and deportation of the Jews of Rome in October 1943.

See also
 Gold of Rome, a 1961 Italian film based on related events
 History of the Jews in Italy

References

Bibliography
 
 Phayer, Michael (2008). Pius XII, The Holocaust, and the Cold War. Indianapolis: Indiana University Press. .
 Sánchez, José M. (2002). Pius XII and the Holocaust: Understanding the Controversy. Washington, D.C.: Catholic University of America Press. .

1940s in Rome
1943 crimes in Italy
Ghettos in Nazi-occupied Europe
History of Rome
The Holocaust in Italy
Holocaust massacres and pogroms in Italy
Jewish Roman (city) history
Nazi-Jewish negotiations
October 1943 events